The men's 10,000 metres event at the 2021 European Athletics U23 Championships was held in Tallinn, Estonia, at Kadriorg Stadium on 8 July.

Records
Prior to the competition, the records were as follows:

Results

References

10,000 metres
10,000 metres at the European Athletics U23 Championships